Versus is the fourth studio album by Finnish rapper Mikael Gabriel. It was released on 15 May 2015. Four singles preceded the release; "Woppaa" featuring Kevin Tandu, "Älä herätä mua unesta", "Viimeisen kerran" featuring Diandra and "Mimmit fiilaa". The album peaked at number two on the Official Finnish Album Chart.

Track listing

Charts

Release history

References

2015 albums
Mikael Gabriel albums